MARA Japan Industrial Institute (MJII, formerly known as MARA Skills Training College Beranang (KKTMBeranang)) is a highly skilled college under management skills and Technical Division (BKT) MARA in Beranang, Malaysia. KKTMBeranang starts in 2004 with an area of 22 acres. KKTMBeranang began operations in June 2008 and the start of the academic session in January 2009.

History 
KKTMBeranang start established as skilled manpower needs of the country, to make the difference compared to other centers where programs are engineered with a focus on the latest technology.

Japanese introduced in the syllabus as a second language after English.

On 19 September 2012, the Cabinet has agreed to change its name from KKTMBeranang to MARA Japan Industrial Institute (MJII).

Vision and Mission

Vision
MJIIBeranang is committed to be the preferred centre for producing semi professional technologist and entrepreneurs in the electronics engineering field to meet industrial and society's needs.

Mission
To provide students with industrial knowledge and hands-on skills in electronics engineering with inclination towards japanese working culture and aspiring entrepreneurship.

Study Program

The main program
Five Diploma in Electronic Engineering conducted at MJII accredited by MQA - The Malaysian Qualifications Agency (MQA Malaysia) for MJII students who are graduating from May 23, 2011, and the Public Service Department (PSD).
 Diploma in Electronic Engineering (Embedded Systems) (MQA / FA1061)
 Diploma in Electronic Engineering (Data Transmission & Networking) (MQA / FA1059)
 Diploma in Electronic Engineering (Microelectronics) (MQA / FA1060)
 Diploma in Electronic Engineering (Electronic Measurement & Control) (MQA / FA1063)
 Diploma in Electronic Engineering (Robotics & Automation) (MQA / FA1062)

Higher Education Program - Japan (MJHEP)
This program is a study that is managed by MARA Director-General Datuk Ibrahim Ahmad MJHEP the MARA Education Foundation (YPM) and University of Kuala Lumpur (UniKL)  conducted at MJII. The main language in this program is Japanese.

Studies Scholarship Program to Japan
The students MJHEP and MJII can continue their studies to degree level in 22 universities in Japan in the same field. They will continue their studies at 11 public universities and 11 private universities.

Host 
MJII always be a place for implementing large programs related to MARA.
 Hari Raya MARA 2012, officiated by Datuk Seri Mohd Shafie bin Haji Apdal
 10th MARA invention and innovation competition IPMA all around Malaysia
 Tree planting program in conjunction with the MARA 46th anniversary, cooperation with MJII and OISCA-OIMC, inaugurated by the general director of MARA
 The signing of the memorandum of understanding between MARA and Brunel University, UK
 MARA education sector committee meeting, chaired by Councilors and senior management of MARA
 The briefing promotion, organized by the 100 unit counselor promotion
 JAD Robocon 2012, JAD-YPM
 Sharing program of experiences by youth entrepreneurs icon of United Kingdom, organized by MARA
 Geek Matsuri organized by MJII
 Lecture by Mr. Internet business. Irfan Khairi - JII
 Briefing for the Master's program (sc) and PhD (sc), UTM
 Briefing promotion program in conjunction with My Talent, Hulu Langat district education office
 Innovation Council PMA 2013, MJII
 WSMB 2015, MJII
i-entrepreneurs Seminar IKM/KKTM/MJII
 Spekma (sports students) all around Malaysia 2015
 MARA Maal Hijrah 2015

References

External links 
 MJII Official web

Colleges in Malaysia
Educational institutions established in 2004
Universities and colleges in Selangor
2004 establishments in Malaysia